Adiabatic (from Gr. ἀ negative + διάβασις passage; transference) refers to any process that occurs without heat transfer.  This concept is used in many areas of physics and engineering. Notable examples are listed below.

Automobiles
 Engine braking, a feature of some diesel engines, uses adiabatic expansion to diminish the vehicle's forward momentum.

Meteorology
 Adiabatic lapse rate, the change in air temperature with changing height, resulting from pressure change.

Quantum chemistry
 Adiabatic invariant Born–Oppenheimer approximation

Thermodynamics
 Adiabatic process
 Adiabatic ionization
 Adiabatic index
 Adiabatic accessibility

Quantum mechanics
 Adiabatic theorem
 Adiabatic quantum motor

Electronics
 Adiabatic circuit
 Adiabatic logic

Carbohydrate chemistry
 Adiabatic map

Extraction
 Adiabatic extraction

References

Thermodynamic processes
Science-related lists